Taulant Kadrija (born 18 May 1993) is a Slovenian footballer who plays for Primorje.

References

External links
PrvaLiga profile 

1993 births
Living people
Slovenian footballers
Association football defenders
Slovenian PrvaLiga players
ND Gorica players
NK Brda players
FK Radnik Bijeljina players
Slovenian expatriate footballers
Expatriate footballers in Bosnia and Herzegovina
Slovenian expatriate sportspeople in Bosnia and Herzegovina